David John Makinson (born 12 January 1961) is a former English cricketer who played in first-class and List A matches for Lancashire. He also appeared in List A matches for Cumberland. Makinson was a right-handed batsman who bowled left-arm fast-medium. He was born at Eccleston, Lancashire.

References

1961 births
Living people
People from Eccleston, Lancashire
English cricketers
Lancashire cricketers
Cumberland cricketers